Resist Records is an independent record label and retail store based in Newtown, New South Wales, Australia. The store was opened by Toe To Toe vocalist, Scotty McFadyen in 1996 before expanding to a record label in 1998. Resist also hosts an annual hardcore punk fest, which has featured local and international hardcore bands.

Artists 

50 Lions
Against Me! (Australian distributor)
alt.
Bare Bones
Better Half
Blkout
Born Free
Break Even
Burning Love (Australian distributor)
Confession
Crisis Alert
The Gaslight Anthem (Australian distributor)
 I Exist
Iron Mind
Jacob
La Dispute (Australian distributor)
Miles Away
Mindsnare
Oslow
Outsiders Code
Parkway Drive
Polaris
Pridelands
Rage
Recovery Room
Shackles
Survival
Terror (Australian distributor)
Vices
Vigilante
Warbrain

Alumni 

A Death in the Family
After The Fall
Bad Blood
Betrayed
Carpathian
Choke
Clever Species
Coué Method
Cry Murder
Day of Contempt
The Dead Walk!
The Disables
Forza Liandri
Found My Direction
God So Loved The World
Her Nightmare
The Hope Conspiracy
The Hot Lies
Icepick
I Killed The Prom Queen
Internal Affairs
Irrelevant
Just Say Go!
The Killchoir Project
Last Nerve
No Apologies
Panic
Shotpointblank
Stronger Than Hate
Taking Sides
Toe to Toe
Toy Boats
Where's the Pope?
Zombie Ghost Train

See also 
Resist Records Discography
List of record labels

References

External links 
Resist Records official site

Hardcore record labels
Australian independent record labels
Retail companies established in 1996
Record labels established in 1998
1996 establishments in Australia
Record labels based in Sydney